This is a list of Dutch television related events from 1963.

Events

Debuts

11 October – Stiefbeen en Zoon

Television shows

1950s
NOS Journaal (1956–present)
Pipo de Clown (1958-1980)

Ending this year

Births
23 April - Rolf Wouters, TV presenter
12 May - Manon Thomas, TV presenter
16 May - Bas Westerweel, TV presenter
18 September - Frits Sissing, TV presenter

Deaths